Wattle Grove is a suburb of Sydney, in the state of New South Wales, Australia. Wattle Grove is located 30 kilometres south-west of the Sydney central business district in the local government area of the City of Liverpool.

Wattle Grove is a residential suburb with a small shopping centre and a number of recreational areas such as Wattle Grove Park, Australis Park, Wattle Grove Lake and the surrounding Lakeside Park.

History
Wattle Grove is built on the land of the Tharawal people. It was also previously land occupied by the Australian Defence Force. The original plans for a suburb were made by the government of Prime Minister Gough Whitlam in the 1970s. Infrastructure was built and the suburb lay dormant until further developed by Delfin Property Group, assisted by the Defence Housing Authority in the 1990s. In 1992, the suburb's name was changed from Holsworthy Village to Wattle Grove. On 12 April 1992, Wattle Grove was officially opened by Prime Minister Bob Hawke.

In 2006, Wattle Grove's tree-lined streets underwent significant change. Many of the Casuarina trees (Australian Pine) that lined the main road were replaced, due to roots potentially damaging nearby houses or falling during storms. Native shrubs have been planted in their place.

Wattle Grove Lake 

Wattle Grove Lake is an artificial lake in the suburb Wattle Grove in Sydney, Australia. It was constructed by Delfin in 1990, along with the surrounding Wattle Grove residential development.

Wattle Grove Lake lies within the Georges River catchment and the Liverpool District sub catchment. It is located 2640 feet (804 metres) from Sydney, Australia. It is a migratory birds place of Australia.

Parkland 
The lake is completely surrounded by Lakeside Park. The parkland includes two play areas and several fitness areas. There is a 15-minute walking trail that surrounds the lake.

Wildlife 
Wattle Grove Lake includes a wildlife reserve, providing home for a variety of water birds. There is a wildlife inaccessible island containing ducks, swans, and other types of birds.

There is a variety of fish that live in the lake, including eels and other marine life.

Fishing, boating, and several other activities concerning the lake are prohibited to protect the wildlife.

Population
According to the 2016 census of Population, there were 8,952 people in Wattle Grove.
 Aboriginal and Torres Strait Islander people made up 1.9% of the population. 
 67.7% of people were born in Australia. The most common countries of birth were India 4.2%, Egypt 2.8%, Philippines 2.2%, England 1.7% and China 1.6%.   
 66.3% of people only spoke English at home. Other languages spoken at home included Arabic 5.3%, Hindi 2.2%, Mandarin 1.8%, Greek 1.6% and Tagalog 1.5%. 
 The most common responses for religion were Catholic 30.9%, No Religion 18.3%, Anglican 13.3%, Hinduism 5.3%.

Commercial area

Wattle Grove's shopping centre was opened in 1998, but in late 2005 several of the businesses were gutted by fire. The centre reopened in 2007 and includes a Coles supermarket, hairdressing salon, real estate agency, pizzeria, pharmacy, charcoal chicken, news agency and other specialty shops. The Wattle Grove Club Hotel is within the complex.

Transport
Wattle Grove is well connected to other regions of Sydney due to its proximity to the M5 and M7 Motorways. Bus routes 901 and 902, operated by Veolia Transport, run within the suburb. Route 901 connects to Holsworthy railway station and Liverpool railway station.

Culture

Community
The Wattle Grove area was designed to have a strong community 'feel' under the redeveloping of the area by Delfin in the 1990s.

Today, it is possible to evaluate the success of this by the large numbers of young families walking the tree lined footpaths on the weekends, and the strong turnouts at community events, such as the Christmas Carols and the Annual Easter Egg Hunt in Australis Park on Easter Sunday.

Schools
Wattle Grove is served by four primary schools: Holsworthy Primary School, Wattle Grove Primary School, St Mark's Coptic Orthodox College and St Christopher's Catholic Primary School, in addition to secondary schools: Holsworthy High School, Moorebank High School and St Mark's Coptic Orthodox College. St Christopher's is a feeder school for All Saints Catholic College Liverpool.

Churches

A chapel of the Church of Jesus Christ of Latter-day Saints and St. Thomas' Indian Orthodox Church are located in Wattle Grove.

Sport and recreation
Playgrounds are located throughout the suburb, as well as walking and bike paths leading to an artificial lake in the suburbs center. Moorebank Sports Club, located nearby, provides opportunities for formal training in rugby league, soccer, hockey, baseball, cricket, Australian rules football, and netball. The Sporting codes are associated with Moorebank Sports Club, all being in the same complex except hockey and AFL which are located in other premises.

Wattle Grove Lake is an artificially constructed lake surrounded by the residential development of Wattle Grove. It is home to a variety of water birds. Anzac Creek is a small stream which leads into Wattle Grove Lake.

Notable people

 Avani Dias (born in 1991), Sri Lankan Australian journalist and radio presenter

References

External links

 Home Values in Wattle Grove
 Fire Brigade Archives
 Coptic Orthodox Schools in Sydney
 Wattle Grove Public School Website
 Holsworthy Public School Website
 Holsworthy High School Website
 St. Christophers Catholic Primary School
 Saint Mark's Coptic College Orthodox College Website
 Holsworthy Junior AFL Website
 Moorebank Cricket Club Website

Suburbs of Sydney
City of Liverpool (New South Wales)